James Seymour (April 10, 1791December 30, 1864) was a Michigan politician.

Early life 
Seymour was born in Hartford County, Connecticut on April 10, 1791.

Political career 
On January 5, 1853, Seymour was worn in as a member of the Michigan House of Representatives from the Genesee County 1st district as a Republican. He served in this seat until 1854. He was then sworn in as a member of the Michigan Senate on January 7, 1857, where he served until 1858.

Personal life 
Seymour married Mira Abigail Hill in 1818.

Death 
Seymour died on December 30, 1864, in Lansing, Michigan. He is interred at Flushing City Cemetery.

References

1791 births
1864 deaths
Republican Party members of the Michigan House of Representatives
Republican Party Michigan state senators
Burials in Michigan
19th-century American politicians